is a Japanese professional boxer. He is the first male Japanese boxer and fourth Asian to be a four-weight world champion, having held the unified WBA and WBC mini-flyweight titles between 2011 and 2012, the WBA (Regular) light-flyweight title from 2012 to 2014, the WBA flyweight title from 2015 to 2017, and the WBO super-flyweight title from 2019 to 2023. As of December 2020, he is ranked as the world’s fourth-best active super-flyweight by BoxRec, and third by The Ring magazine and the Transnational Boxing Rankings Board. He is also ranked as the world's ninth-best boxer, pound for pound, by The Ring.

Amateur career
Kazuto Ioka is the nephew of flyweight champion Hiroki Ioka. Kazuto asked his father to teach him how to box as a teenager. His father, Kazunori Ioka, would continue training him through his amateur and professional career. Ioka amassed a record of 95-10 as an amateur, winning six national high school tournaments along the way. He reached the semifinals of the 2008 King's Cup, an amateur boxing tournament held in Thailand, before losing to Amnat Ruenroeng. Ioka joined Tokyo Agricultural University, hoping to represent his country in the 2008 Olympics but he would fall short on the qualifiers.

Amateur highlights
16th All Japan Selected High School Boxing Championships, Light flyweight Tournament winner (2005)
17th All Japan Selected High School Boxing Championships, Light flyweight Tournament winner (2006)
59th Inter-highschool championships, Boxing, Light flyweight Tournament winner
60th Inter-highschool championships, Boxing, Light flyweight Tournament winner
60th National Sports Festival, Boxing, Boys, Light flyweight Tournament winner
61st National Sports Festival, Boxing, Boys, Light flyweight Tournament winner
62nd National Sports Festival, Boxing, Adult, Light flyweight Tournament winner
63rd National Sports Festival, Boxing, Adult, Light flyweight Tournament winner

Professional career

Early career
Upon failing to qualify for the Olympics, Ioka dropped out from college and turned professional in 2009. On April 12, 2009, he fought against Thongthailek Sor Tanapinyo, and won his debut via a third-round technical knockout. After this victory, he won six straight victories. After winning 5 fights, Ioka competed for the vacant Japanese light flyweight title. Ioka captured the national title by stopping Masayoshi Segawa in the final 10th round.

Mini-flyweight

WBC mini-flyweight champion 
In his next fight, Ioka won the WBC mini-flyweight title from Oleydong Sithsamerchai via a fifth-round technical knockout in the latter's seventh title defence at the World Memorial Hall, in February 2011. Sithsamerchai was knocked down twice over the course of his first professional loss. 

Ioka went on to defend his title twice in 2011, first against Juan Hernández, winning via unanimous decision (118–111, 117–111, 116–112), and then against Yodgoen Tor Chalermchai, winning via first-round technical knockout on New Year's Eve 2011.

Unified mini-flyweight champion 
On 20 June 2012, Ioka met WBA champion Akira Yaegashi in a match that marked the first time two Japanese fighters had met to unify world titles. The fight took place at the Osaka Prefectural Gymnasium. Ioka defeated the WBA champion Akira Yaegashi via a unanimous decision (115–113, 115–113, 115–114). The two fighters exchanged hard shots throughout a tense, tactical fight. The fight ended with Yaegashi and Ioka trading combinations while looking for a knockout. From early in the fight, Yaegashi's eye was nearly shut. The ringside doctor performed several checks on it but Yaegashi was allowed to finish the fight. When asked whether the result would have been different unless he got swollen eyes, Yaegashi said "We should not think about it. There is no if's in boxing". The day after the fight, Ioka decided to move up a weight division.

Light-flyweight

WBA (Regular) light-flyweight champion 
Shortly after the fight, Ioka moved up to light flyweight as well. On December 31, 2012, Ioka beat undefeated José Alfredo Rodríguez for the vacant WBA (Regular) light-flyweight title at the Osaka Prefectural Gymnasium. Ioka knocked Rodríguez down once in round 1 and twice in round 6 before the referee stopped the fight. Ioka held the Regular version of the WBA's title, while Román Gonzalez was the WBA (Super) champion. Ioka went on to defend his title three times but he never faced González.

Flyweight
On February 28, 2014, Ioka would vacate the WBA title to move up to the flyweight division in order to attempt becoming a three division world champion. On May 7, 2014, Ioka faced Thai IBF champion Amnat Ruenroeng at the Osaka Prefectural Gymnasium. Ioka seemed to be the more active boxer but Ruenroeng landed heavier blows while countering Ioka. Ruenroeng lost a point for hitting after the break. Nevertheless, Ruenroeng retained his title with a split decision (119–108, 115–112, 113–114). The 119–108 card turned in by judge Pawel Kardyni was criticized as being far too wide.

WBA flyweight champion 
On April 22, 2015, Ioka realized his goal to be a triple champion, when he defeated WBA (Regular) champion Juan Carlos Reveco by majority decision (116–113, 115–113, 114–114). The fight saw Reveco take the early rounds but Ioka came on strong in the middle rounds and got the nod in the end. Reveco appealed the decision to the World Boxing Association, who ordered an immediate rematch. Ioka was later granted a voluntary defense against Roberto Sosa, with the winner ordered to face Reveco. Ioka beat Sosa in a shutout unanimous decision (120–108, 119–109, 119–109). The Ioka-Reveco rematch was set for December 2015. Ioka outworked Reveco at the start of the match. However, Reveco started rallying in round 7. Ioka answered in kind, nearly knocking out Reveco. Reveco finally went down in round 11 following a series of hooks to the body.

Ioka was nearing a deal to fight WBA (Super) flyweight champion Juan Francisco Estrada, when the latter vacated to compete at super flyweight. Ioka was knocked down for the first time in his career against 18 year old challenger and WBA interim champion Stamp Kiatniwat. Ioka rallied, pummeling Kiatniwat to the body, until he finally dropped the challenger twice in round 9. The referee halted the fight with the second knockdown. The win was Ioka's fourth flyweight defense.

In November 2017, Ioka vacated his title after five successful defenses. He was planning to defend on December 31 but his father stated that he would not be ready to do so, as he hadn't kept up with his training after getting married earlier in the year to Nana Tanimura. Ioka went on to announce his retirement at age 28 after getting married and reportedly falling out with his father and promoter, Kazunori Ioka.

Super-flyweight
On New Year's Eve in 2018, Ioka fought four weight champion Donnie Nietes for the WBO super-flyweight title in an attempt to win a world title in a fourth weight class. Although many thought Ioka had done enough to win the fight, he controversially lost by split decision, with a 116–112 scorecard in his favor being overruled by 116–112 and 118–110 scorecards in favor of Nietes.

WBO super-flyweight champion 
In June 2019, Ioka fought Aston Palicte for the vacant WBO super flyweight title in his second attempt to become a four-weight champion. In the tenth round, after leading on all three judges' scorecards, Ioka scored a TKO victory to become the first Japanese boxer in history to win a major title in four weight classes.

On New Year's Eve in 2019, Ioka fought undefeated Jeyvier Cintrón in his first defense of his WBO title, winning a twelve-round unanimous decision with two judges scoring the bout 116–112 and the third scoring it 115–113.

Ioka made the second defense of his WBO title in an exciting fight against undefeated three weight champion and domestic foe Kosei Tanaka on New Year's Eve 2020 in Tokyo. After a competitive first four rounds in which Tanaka was the aggressor and Ioka found success with counter punches, Ioka dropped his opponent in the fifth round with a counter left hook. With about a minute left in the sixth round, he again knocked Tanaka down. In the eighth round, Ioka caught his opponent with another hard counter left hook, and referee Michiaki Someya caught Tanaka before he could fall and waved off the fight, with Ioka retaining his WBO title via eighth-round technical knockout.

On June 1, 2021, the WBO ordered Ioka to defend his super-flyweight title against their #2 contender in the division, former unified mini-flyweight champion Francisco Rodríguez Jr. The bout between Ioka and Rodríguez took place on September 1, 2021 in Tokyo. Ioka won the fight by unanimous decision, with all three judges awarding scores of 116–112 in his favor.

Ioka vs. Ancajas cancellation
Ioka was expected to face the IBF super flyweight champion Jerwin Ancajas in a title unification bout on December 31, 2021, at the Ota City General Gymnasium in Tokyo, Japan. The fight was officially postponed on December 3, as stricter COVID-19 measures imposed by the Japanese government prevented Ancajas from entering the country. Ioka was rescheduled to face the WBO Asia Pacific and OPBF super flyweight champion Ryoji Fukunaga instead, on the same date and at the same venue. He won the fight by unanimous decision, with scores of 115-113, 116-112 and 118-110.

Ioka vs. Nietes II
On April 1, 2022, the WBO ordered Ioka to make a mandatory title defense against Donnie Nietes. The bout will be a rematch of their December 31, 2018, fight, which Nietes won by split decision. The pair came to an agreement a month later, and officially announced the bout for July 13. Ioka won the fight by unanimous decision, with scores of 120–108, 118–110 and 117–111.

Ioka vs. Frano
On December 31, 2022, Ioka made his sixth super flyweight title defense in a unification bout with WBA champion Joshua Franco. They fought into a majority draw and retained both their titles. Ioka vacated the WBO title on February 14, in order to face Franco in a rematch after being ordered to make a mandatory title defense against Junto Nakatani.

Personal life 
Ioka was born in Sakai, Osaka, and currently resides in Tokyo.

In April 2021, reports surfaced that Ioka had failed a drug test and tested positive for marijuana, with the sample having been examined at length as part of an ongoing investigation with the National Police Agency as well as the Japanese Boxing Commission (JBC). Speaking on Ioka's behalf, his lawyer Masanao Hattori said that Ioka “strongly denies he has ever used” any form of cannabis, and suggested it could be attributed to the use of CBD oil. On 19 May 2021, Ioka was cleared of all doping charges, as it emerged that the JBC had mishandled the samples, and they took responsibility for their poor sample management.

Professional boxing record

See also
List of mini-flyweight boxing champions
List of light-flyweight boxing champions
List of flyweight boxing champions
List of super-flyweight boxing champions
List of boxing quadruple champions
List of WBA world champions
List of WBC world champions
List of WBO world champions
List of Japanese boxing world champions
Boxing in Japan

References

External links

Kazuto Ioka - Profile, News Archive & Current Rankings at Box.Live

1989 births
Living people
Mini-flyweight boxers
Light-flyweight boxers
Flyweight boxers
Super-flyweight boxers
World mini-flyweight boxing champions
World light-flyweight boxing champions
World flyweight boxing champions
World super-flyweight boxing champions
World Boxing Association champions
World Boxing Council champions
World Boxing Organization champions
People from Sakai, Osaka
Japanese male boxers
21st-century Japanese people